Sideroxylon dominicanum is a species of plant in the family Sapotaceae. It is endemic to the Dominican Republic in the Caribbean.

References

dominicanum
Vulnerable plants
Endemic flora of the Dominican Republic
Taxonomy articles created by Polbot